Alfred Joseph Gummer (18 March 1899 − 2 April 1962) was an Australian Roman Catholic bishop.

Ordained to the priesthood on 31 March 1923, Gummer was named bishop of the Roman Catholic Diocese of Geraldton, Australia in 1942 and died in 1962 while still in office.

References 

1899 births
1962 deaths
People from Perth, Western Australia
20th-century Roman Catholic bishops in Australia
Roman Catholic bishops of Geraldton